Euparyphus cinctus is a species in the family Stratiomyidae ("soldier flies"), in the order Diptera.

Distribution
United States, Mexico.

References

Stratiomyidae
Insects described in 1886
Taxa named by Carl Robert Osten-Sacken
Diptera of North America